Leslie William Steel (1900 – 28 April 1966) was a rugby league footballer in Australia's major competition, the New South Wales Rugby League (NSWRL).

Playing career
Steel played over 100 matches for his club side, Eastern Suburbs in the years (1922–29). A Winger, Steel was a try scorer in Easts 1923 premiership victory. In 1922 Steel was selected to represent New South Wales.  He was the top try scorer for Eastern Suburbs in 1923, 1925 and 1928. 

Following his football career, Steel spent many years as an official of the Eastern Suburbs club. He died at Hurstville, New South Wales in 1966.

References

 

Australian rugby league players
Sydney Roosters players
Sydney Roosters captains
New South Wales rugby league team players
1900 births
1966 deaths
Place of birth missing
Rugby league wingers